The cabinet of Ion G. Duca was the government of Romania from 14 November to 29 December 1933.

Ministers
The ministers of the cabinet were as follows:

President of the Council of Ministers:
Ion Gh. Duca (14 November - 29 December 1933)
Minister of the Interior:
Ion Inculeț (14 November - 29 December 1933)
Minister of Foreign Affairs: 
Nicolae Titulescu (14 November - 29 December 1933)
Minister of Finance:
Constantin I. C. Brătianu (14 November - 29 December 1933)
Minister of Justice:
Victor Antonescu (14 November - 29 December 1933)
Minister of Public Instruction, Religious Affairs, and the Arts:
Constantin Angelescu (14 November - 29 December 1933)
Minister of National Defence:
Gen. Nicolae Uică (14 November - 29 December 1933)
Minister of Agriculture and Property
Gheorghe Cipăianu (14 November - 29 December 1933)
Minister of Industry and Commerce:
Gheorghe Tătărăscu (14 November - 29 December 1933)
Minister of Labour, Health, and Social Security:
Constantin D. Dimitriu (14 November - 29 December 1933)
Minister of Public Works and Communications:
Richard Franasovici (14 November - 29 December 1933)

Ministers of State:
Ion Nistor (14 November - 29 December 1933)
Alexandru Lapedatu (14 November - 29 December 1933)

References

Cabinets of Romania
Cabinets established in 1933
Cabinets disestablished in 1933
1933 establishments in Romania
1933 disestablishments in Romania